Bobby Joel Copping (born 27 September 2001) is an English former footballer who played as a defender.

Career
Copping began his career in the Norwich City academy, after being scouted playing for Dereham Wanderers. He spent nine years at Norwich, before joining Bury's academy. Copping made a first-team appearance in the Senior Lancashire Cup Final against Fleetwood Town at the age of 16. He left Bury after they were expelled from the Football League in August 2019. He went on trial with Brighton and Hove Albion, and had an offer from Sunderland, but ultimately chose to sign for Peterborough United, making his debut against Cambridge United in the EFL Trophy in November 2019. Copping appeared on the bench in Peterborough's League One tie against Bristol Rovers in December 2019.

In July 2020, following a header in a training game, Copping spent four days in hospital after suffering a mini-seizure, losing his sight and going numb down one side of his body. After a recurrence of this in his return game he announced his retirement, aged 19, in February 2021. After retiring, Copping took up a business operations role within the Peterborough United academy

Career statistics

References

2001 births
Living people
People from Essex
English footballers
Association football defenders
Norwich City F.C. players
Bury F.C. players
Peterborough United F.C. players